Global Media Group (formerly Controlinveste) is a Portuguese media holding company founded  by Portuguese sports mogul and FC Porto S.A.D.'s shareholder Joaquim Oliveira.

History and profile
Controlinveste was founded in 2005 after the amalgamation of Lusomundo Media and Olivedesportos.

In 2013, Controlinveste was sold partly inter alia to Angolan investor António Mosquito Mbakassi (27.5%), representing a group of investors from Angola. The other parts were sold to Luís Montez (15%), Banco Comercial Português (15%) and Banco Espírito Santo (15%). Founder and owner Joaquim Oliveira keeps the remaining 27.5%. The deal included all of its print media and a radio station, which are Diário de Notícias, Jornal de Notícias, O Jogo, Açoriano Oriental and TSF, focusing uniquely on its major asset, Sport TV.

On 17 December 2014, Controlinveste unveiled their new identity as Global Media Group and officially took the new name on 12 January 2015.

Grupo BEL

In September 2020, the Global Media Group reached an agreement with Grupo BEL, owned by businessman Marco Galinha, for its entry as a shareholder in the company. The Grupo BEL was founded in 2001 by Marco Galinha and operates in various sectors as vending machines, aeronautics and media (through Jornal Económico in 2018). Marco Galinha is the executive president and chairman of the board of directors of the Grupo BEL.

Marco Galinha was a member of the CES - Conselho Económico Social (2016-2019), member of the CIP - Confederação Empresarial de Portugal (2016-2019) and Vice President of ANJE - Associação Nacional de Jovens Empresários (2016-2019). Becomes President of Global Media Group in February 2021.

Holders of 5% or more of the company's capital are as follows:

KNJ Global Holdings Limited - 35,25%

Páginas Civilizadas, Lda. – 29,75%

José Pedro Carvalho Reis Soeiro - 24,5%

Grandes Notícias, Lda. - 10,5%

References

Titles

O Global Media Group is the owner of: 
 Açoriano Oriental
Classificados DN, JN e OJOGO
 Delas
 Diário de Notícias
 Diário de Notícias da Madeira
 Dinheiro Vivo (jornal)
 Evasões
 JN História
 Jornal de Notícias
 Men's Health
Motor24
N-TV
 Notícias Magazine
 O Jogo
 TSF
 Volta ao Mundo
Women's Health

Mass media companies of Portugal
Companies based in Lisbon
Mass media in Lisbon
Holding companies of Portugal
Holding companies established in 2005
Mass media companies established in 2005
2005 establishments in Portugal